"Pilot" is the pilot episode of The CW television series, The Vampire Diaries, as well as the first episode of the series. It originally aired on Thursday, September 10, 2009. The teleplay was written by Kevin Williamson and Julie Plec and it directed by Marcos Siega.

Plot

The episode begins with a couple, Darren Malloy (Steve Belford) and Brooke Fenton (Cindy Busby), driving their car when, suddenly the area fills with thick fog and they hit someone. They stop to see if the person is injured, however both of them end up being killed by this person.

In the small, Virginia town of Mystic Falls, Elena Gilbert (Nina Dobrev) and her brother Jeremy (Steven R. McQueen) cannot come to grips with the fact that their parents had recently died in an crash involving their car driving off the edge of Wickery Bridge and that they are being looked after by their aunt, Jenna (Sara Canning), who acts more like their friend than a parent. Elena becomes emotionally withdrawn after recently breaking up with her boyfriend and former best friend, Matt, while Jeremy turns to drugs to avoid dealing with his own feelings. At school, Elena bumps into the mysterious new student, Stefan Salvatore (Paul Wesley), after she had just walked out of the men's restroom. The mystery guy attracts Elena's and clearly Caroline's attention.

Elena goes to the cemetery to visit her parents' grave and write in her diary. While writing, a crow appears and refuses to move even when she attempts to scare it away. Suddenly, fog begins to cover everything and Elena starts running, dropping her journal. She trips, gets hurt, and upon standing up, finds Stefan there. While they talk, the smell of blood from Elena's leg seems to cause some changes in Stefan's face who vanishes as Elena lifts her pant leg up to check on the cut. He later goes to Elena's house to apologize for vanishing and returns her journal to her. He reassures her that he didn't read it, seeing as he wouldn't want anyone reading his. Moments later, Elena invites Stefan to The Mystic Grill with Matt, Caroline and Bonnie.

Matt seems upset about his break up with Elena so he talks to Bonnie about it. Caroline walks in so Bonnie goes to talk to her. They take a seat and wait for Stefan and Elena to arrive. Afterwards, Stefan is invited to a campfire party which he agreed to go to if Elena goes to. She agreed.

At the Salvatore house, Zach (Chris William Martin), after seeing the news about the two people who were attacked by an animal, asks Stefan why he came back and why he attacked these people despite his promise not to hurt anyone. Stefan denies that he had anything to do with the attack and leaves to attend the campfire party where Elena will be.

Elena's friend, Bonnie (Kat Graham), tries to make fun of her grandmother who told her that she is a psychic, but she gets a picture of fog, a crow and a cemetery when she touches Elena . Intuitively, she suspects something is strange about Stefan when they meet up at a campfire party after Bonnie touched Stefan. She felt blackness. Death.

Matt's sister Vicki (Kayla Ewell) is found by Jeremy in the woods, bitten by something they believe to be an animal. Stefan realizes that there is someone else in town who is like him and who is also responsible for the first two attacks and he runs back home; Matt watches him and thinks he is acting weird. As his sister is losing a lot of blood, Matt chooses to ignore the red flag. He informs Zach about it and then Stefan's brother, Damon (Ian Somerhalder), appears.

Stefan confronts Damon why he is in Mystic Falls despite his dislike of the town. Damon answers that he is in town because of Elena, who looks similar to a girl named Katherine whom Stefan keeps a picture of from 1864. Damon tells Stefan to feed on Elena and the siblings get into a fight. Damon, who is much stronger than his brother because he is feeding on human blood, beats Stefan. Damon takes Stefan's ring which seems important for their survival though its features still seem mysterious, but he then gives it back.

In the meantime, Vicki wakes up at the hospital with Matt by her side. She whispers the words "vampire" and then drifts back to sleep. Matt is concerned but doesn't want to wake her.

Production
Initially Kevin Williamson had little interest in developing the series, finding the premise too similar to other vampire tales. However, at Julie Plec's urging, he began to read the novels and started to become intrigued by the story: "I began to realize that it was a story about a small town, about that town's underbelly and about what lurks under the surface." Williamson has stated the town's story will be the main focus of the series, rather than high school.

On February 6, 2009, Variety announced that The CW had greenlit the pilot for The Vampire Diaries with Williamson and Julie Plec set as the head writers and executive producers. On May 19, 2009, the series was officially ordered for the 2009–2010 season.

The pilot episode was filmed in Vancouver, British Columbia, but the rest of the episodes have been filmed in Covington, Georgia (which doubles as the fictional small town of Mystic Falls, Virginia) and various other communities around Greater Atlanta, to take advantage of local tax incentives.

Feature music 
In the Pilot episode of the show we can hear the songs:
 "Here We Go" by Mat Kearney
 "Siren Song" by Bat for Lashes
 "Never Say Never" by The Fray
 "Back to Me" by The All-American Rejects
 "Death" by White Lies
 "Running Up that Hill" by Placebo
 "Kids" by MGMT
 "Thinking of You" by Katy Perry
 "Say (All I Need)" by OneRepublic
 "Consolers of the Lonely" by The Raconteurs
 "Sort Of" by Silversun Pickups
 "Take me to the Riot" by Stars
 "Kuh" by Lalala

Reception

Ratings
The initial 30 minutes of the episode was watched by 4.713 million of viewers, with 5.100 million of viewers tuning in for the second half of the hour, bringing the total of viewers up to a total of 4.906 million of viewers. Plus the Live + 7 DVR Ratings the series premiere scored an even higher 5.7 million of viewers. Till date, is the most watched episode in the history of the show.

Reviews
Dan Phillips from IGN gave the episode 7/10 and compared it with the Twilight movie and the series Dawson's Creek. "The Vampires Diaries obviously isn't the most original show, but it's not without its redeeming qualities. A good chunk of the show's target demographic of angst-ridden teenagers will likely fall in love at first sight, and their male counterparts might even derive some entertainment out of it as well. That said, if my girlfriend voiced an interest in sitting down to watch this romantic vampire show together, I'd probably ask her if we could watch True Blood instead."

Alyse Wax of Fear Net stated that the show is "worth viewing" with a "strong cast" and she was "pleasantly surprised". "I honestly thought it was going to be another teen throwaway, capitalizing on the success of Twilight. But having Kevin Williamson (Scream, Dawson's Creek) at the helm definitely bumps up the quality of the show several notches. Pilots are notoriously weak: they have to set up an entire cast of characters, an episode plot as well as a series arc, and often have significantly less time and resources than a standard series episode. The Vampire Diaries pilot took its time – Damon wasn't even introduced until the last act."

Liana Aghajanian of Mania gave a good review to the episode saying that is "not as sucky as you think" and stated: "For all its plot similarities to other current vampire dramas, somewhat stagnant dialogue and hard to believe scare tactics, “The Vampire Diaries” has zoned in on an audience that will remain faithful to the show – no matter how many times they've seen the bites, camera and action before."

Cheril Vernon of Crushable also gave a good review to the episode saying that it was "creepy at times" and with "great supporting characters".

Emily St. James (formerly known as Emily VanDerWerff) from The A.V. Club gave a C− rate to the episode.

References

External links
 
 
 The Vampire Diaries Episode Listings
 Recap from Official Website

Pilot (Vampire Diaries)
Vampire Diaries, The
The Vampire Diaries (season 1) episodes
Television episodes directed by Marcos Siega